1933 Tinchen, provisional designation , is a Vestian asteroid from the inner regions of the asteroid belt, about 5 kilometers in diameter. It was discovered on 14 January 1972, by Czech astronomer Luboš Kohoutek at the Hamburger Bergedorf Observatory in Germany, who named it after his wife, Christine Kohoutek.

Classification and orbit 

Tinchen orbits the Sun in the inner main-belt at a distance of 2.1–2.6 AU once every 3 years and 7 months (1,318 days). Its orbit has an eccentricity of 0.12 and an inclination of 7° with respect to the ecliptic.

The vestoid or V-type asteroid is also a member of the Vesta family. Asteroids with these spectral and orbital characteristics are thought to have all originated from the Rheasilvia crater, a large impact crater on the south-polar surface of 4 Vesta, which is the main-belt's second-most-massive asteroid after 1 Ceres.

Physical characteristics 

Tinchen has a rotation period of 3.671 hours.

According to the survey carried out by NASA's Wide-field Infrared Survey Explorer with its subsequent NEOWISE mission, Tinchen measures between 4.51 and 6.454 kilometers in diameter and its surface has an albedo between 0.2950 and 0.613. The Collaborative Asteroid Lightcurve Link assumes a standard albedo for Vestian asteroids of 0.40 and calculates a diameter of 5.04 kilometers with an absolute magnitude of 13.1.

Naming 

The discoverer named this minor planet after his wife, Christine Kohoutek. The official  was published by the Minor Planet Center on 20 February 1976.

Notes

References

External links 
 Asteroid Lightcurve Database (LCDB), query form (info )
 Dictionary of Minor Planet Names, Google books
 Asteroids and comets rotation curves, CdR – Observatoire de Genève, Raoul Behrend
 Discovery Circumstances: Numbered Minor Planets (1)-(5000) – Minor Planet Center
 
 

001933
Discoveries by Luboš Kohoutek
Named minor planets
19720114